Pimpalgaon Tarf Khed  is a panchayat village in the state of Maharashtra, India, on the left (east) bank of the Bhima River.  Administratively, Pimpalgaon Tarf Khed is under Khed Taluka of Pune District in Maharashtra. The village of Pimpalgaon Tarf Khed is 11 km east of the town of Chakan, and 23 km by road south of the town of Rajgurunagar (Khed).

There are four villages in the Pimpalgaon T. Khed gram panchayat: Pimpalgaon Tarf Khed, Velhavale, Waki Tarf Wada and Wanjale.

Demographics 
In the 2001 census, the village of Pimpalgaon Tarf Khed had 5,957 inhabitants, with 3,021 males (50.7%) and 2,936 females (49.3%), for a gender ratio of 972 females per thousand males.

Notes

External links 
 
 

Villages in Pune district